This is a complete list of National Historic Landmarks in Kentucky.  There are 32 such landmarks in Kentucky; one landmark has had its designation withdrawn.

|}

See also
National Register of Historic Places listings in Kentucky
List of National Historic Landmarks by state

References

Kentucky
 
National Historic Landmarks
National Historic Landmarks
National Historic Landmarks